Stephen David Krasner (born February 15, 1942) is an American academic and former diplomat. Krasner has been a professor of international relations at Stanford University since 1981, and served as the Director of Policy Planning from 2005 to April 2007 while on leave from Stanford. 

A realist, he is known for his contributions to International Relations and International Political Economy.

Education 

Krasner was born on February 15, 1942, in New York City. He was raised in Manhattan. He received his bachelor's degree from the Department of History at Cornell University in 1963, where he was a member of the Quill and Dagger society. He earned his master's degree from Columbia University. In 1972, he completed his PhD at Harvard University. He did his PhD dissertation on the international coffee market. At Harvard University, he was influenced by Albert Hirschman.

Career 
Before coming to Stanford University in 1981, Krasner taught at Harvard University and University of California, Los Angeles. He was the editor of International Organization from 1986 to 1992.

Krasner is the author of six books and over ninety articles. He has taught courses on international relations, international political economy, international relations theory, policy making, and state-building at Stanford University. He received a dean’s award for excellence in teaching in 1991. At Stanford University, Krasner has been an advisor to Daniel Drezner and  

Krasner was a key figure in establishing Regime theory as a prominent topic of study in IR, in part through the 1983 edited collection International Regimes. Krasner is a key figure in the development of Hegemonic stability theory. Krasner was influenced by Robert Gilpin. 

He has written extensively about statehood and sovereignty.

Krasner is credited with incorporating the idea of punctuated equilibrium into the social sciences and contributing to critical juncture theory.

Krasner is a senior fellow at Stanford's Hoover Institution.

Krasner was named Director of Policy Planning in the State Department by his former Stanford University colleague Condoleezza Rice.

Bibliography
Are Bureaucracies Important? (1972)
State Power and the Structure of International Trade" (1976)Defending the National Interest: Raw Materials Investment and American Foreign Policy (1978)Structural Conflict: The Third World Against Global Liberalism (1985)Compromising Westphalia (1996)Sovereignty: Organized Hypocrisy (1999)Addressing State Failure (2005)Building Democracy After Conflict: The Case For Shared Sovereignty (2005)Power, the State, and Sovereignty: Essays on International Relations (2009)

Edited worksInternational Regimes (1983)Exploration and Contestation in the Study of World Politics (co-editor, 1999)Problematic Sovereignty: Contested Rules and Political Possibilities (2001)

Selected articles
 
 Krasner, Stephen D. 1984. "Approaches to the State: Alternative Conceptions and Historical Dynamics." Comparative Politics 16(2): 223–46; 
 Krasner, Stephen D. 1988. "Sovereignty: An Institutional Perspective." Comparative Political Studies'' 21(1): 66–94.

References

External links 
State Department Biography
Stanford University Homepage
Beyond Intractability: International Regimes
Interview with Stephen Krasner by Theory Talks

1942 births
Directors of Policy Planning
Stanford University Department of Political Science faculty
School of International and Public Affairs, Columbia University alumni
Cornell University alumni
Harvard University alumni
Living people
Political realists